Country Classics is the thirtieth studio album by American country music artist Charley Pride. It was released in March 1983 via RCA Records. The album includes the single "More and More".

Track listing

Chart performance

References

1983 albums
Charley Pride albums
Albums produced by Norro Wilson
RCA Records albums